Macruronus is a genus of merluccid hakes. Most are found in southern oceans off Argentina, Chile, South Africa, Australia and New Zealand, but M. maderensis (which is in need of taxonomic review) is only known from Madeira. Members of this genus reach  in length depending on the exact species involved.

Species
The currently recognized species in this genus are:
 Macruronus capensis D. H. Davies, 1950 (Cape grenadier, South African straptail)
 Macruronus maderensis Maul, 1951
 Macruronus magellanicus Lönnberg, 1907 (Patagonian grenadier)
 Macruronus novaezelandiae (Hector, 1871) (Blue grenadier)

Note that the Catalog of Fishes considers Macruronus capensis and M. magellanicus (following Leslie and colleagues (2018) and others) as junior synonyms of M. novaezelandiae. This leaves the genus with one confirmed species and one with uncertain status.

References

Merlucciidae
Ray-finned fish genera
Marine fish genera
Taxa named by Albert Günther